The following is a non-exhaustive list of Buddhist temples, monasteries, pagodas, grottoes, archaeological sites and colossal statues in China.

Buddhist temples

Anhui
Mount Jiuhua
Baisui Palace
Ganlu Temple (Mount Jiuhua)
Huacheng Temple
Shrine of Living Buddha
Tiantai Temple (Mount Jiuhua)
Zhantalin
Zhiyuan Temple (Mount Jiuhua)
Baisuigong Temple
Qiyuansi Temple
Roushen Temple
Tianchi Temple
Dabeilou Temple
Guangji Temple (Wuhu)
Langya Temple
Mingjiao Temple (Anhui)
Sanzu Temple
Shangchan Temple
Yingjiang Temple
Zhenfeng Pagoda

Beijing
Badachu
Bailin Temple (Beijing)
Baipu Temple
Big Bell Temple (or Juesheng Temple)
Cheng'en Temple
Cloud Platform at Juyongguan
Dahui Temple
Dajue Temple
Dule Temple
Fahai Temple
Fayuan Temple
Guanghua Temple (Beijing)
Guangji Temple (Beijing)
Hongluo Temple
Jietai Temple
Lingguang Temple (Beijing)
Miaoying Temple
Pagoda of Tianning Temple
Tanzhe Temple
Temple of Azure Clouds
Tiankai Temple
Tianning Temple (Beijing)
Tongjiao Temple
Wanshou Temple
Wofo Temple
Xifeng Temple
Xihuang Temple
Yonghe Temple
Yunju Temple
Zhenjue Temple
Zhihua Temple

Chongqing 

Ciyun Temple (Chongqing)
Luohan Temple (Chongqing)
Shuanggui Temple
Tongliang Iron Buddha Temple

Fujian
Chengtian Temple (Quanzhou)
Chongfu Temple (Quanzhou)
Chongsheng Temple (Fujian)
Cishou Temple
Dizang Temple (Fuzhou)
Guanghua Temple (Putian)
Guangxiao Temple (Putian)
Hualin Temple (Fuzhou)
Huayan Temple (Ningde)
Jinshan Temple (Fujian)
Kaiyuan Temple (Quanzhou)
Linyang Temple
Longshan Temple (Jinjiang)
Nanshan Temple
Pagoda of Cishou Temple
South Putuo Temple
Wanfu Temple
Xichan Temple (Fujian)
Yongquan Temple (Fuzhou)

Gansu 

Dafo Temple (Zhangye)
Labrang Monastery
Ta'er Temple (Suoyang City)
White Horse Pagoda, Dunhuang

Guangdong
Guangxiao Temple (Guangzhou)
Hoi Tong Monastery
Kaiyuan Temple (Chaozhou)
Lingshan Temple (Shantou)
Nanhua Temple
Qingyun Temple (Guangdong)
Temple of the Six Banyan Trees
Yunmen Temple (Guangdong)

Guizhou 

Hongfu Temple (Guiyang)
Qianming Temple

Hainan 

Nanshan Temple (Sanya)

Hebei
Bailin Temple
Geyuan Temple
Iron Buddha Temple (Dongguang)
Kaishan Temple
Liaodi Pagoda
Lingxiao Pagoda
Linji Temple
Longxing Monastery
Pagoda of Bailin Temple
Pagoda of Tiangong Temple
Puning Temple (Hebei)
Putuo Zongcheng Temple
Xumi Pagoda

Henan
Daxingguo Temple
Fawang Temple
Fragrant Mountain Temple at Longmen Grottoes
Iron Pagoda
Jidu Temple
Jinshan Temple (Hebi)
Pagoda Forest at Shaolin Temple
Qizu Pagoda
Shaolin Monastery 
Songyue Pagoda
White Horse Temple
Xiangyan Temple
Youguo Temple

Inner Mongolia Autonomous Region 

 Five Pagoda Temple (Hohhot)

Hubei
Guiyuan Temple
Baotong Temple
Iron Buddha Temple (Xiangfan)
Wuying Pagoda
Wuzu Temple

Hunan 

Baiyun Temple (Ningxiang)
Fuyan Temple
Grand Temple of Mount Heng
Guangji Temple (Hunan)
Kaifu Temple
Lingsheng Temple
Lushan Temple
Miyin Temple
Nantai Temple
Puguang Temple (Zhangjiajie)
Puji Temple (Ningxiang)
Shangfeng Temple
Yunmen Temple (Hunan) 
Zhaoshan Temple
Zhusheng Temple (Hunan)

Hong Kong
Cham Shan Monastery
Chi Lin Nunnery
Miu Fat Buddhist Monastery
Po Lin Monastery
Ten Thousand Buddhas Monastery
Tsing Shan Monastery
Tsz Shan Monastery
Tung Lin Kok Yuen
Tung Po Tor Monastery

Jiangsu
Chongshan Temple (Jiangsu)
Daming Temple
Dinghui Temple
Gaomin Temple
Guangjiao Temple (Nantong)
Hanshan Temple
Huiji Temple (Nanjing)
Huqiu Tower
Jiming Temple
Jinshan Temple (Zhenjiang)
Linggu Temple
Lingyanshan Temple
Longchang Temple
Qingliang Temple (Changzhou)
Qixia Temple
Tianning Temple (Changzhou) (天宁宝塔) in Changzhou, which contains the tallest pagoda in the world. Height: .
Tiger Hill Pagoda
Xingfu Temple (Changshu)
Xiyuan Temple
Yunyan Temple (Suzhou)

Jiangxi
Donglin Temple
Jingju Temple (Ji'an)
Nengren Temple (Jiujiang)
Puning Temple (Jiangxi)
Zhenru Temple (Jiangxi)

Jilin 

Banruo Temple (Changchun)
Dizang Temple (Changchun)
Guanyin Ancient Temple

Liaoning 

Banruo Temple (Shenyang)
Ci'en Temple (Liaoning)
Fengguo Temple
Guangji Temple (Jinzhou)
Zhiyuan Temple (Panjin)

Macau 

 Kun Iam Temple, (also known as Pou Chai Temple, Chinese: 普濟禪院)

Ningxia
Baisigou Square Pagoda
Haibao Pagoda Temple
Hongfo Pagoda
One Hundred and Eight Stupas
Pagoda of Chengtian Temple

Shaanxi
Caotang Temple
Daci'en Temple
Daxingshan Temple
Famen Temple
Giant Wild Goose Pagoda
Guangren Temple
Jianfu Temple
Jingye Temple
Qinglong Temple (Xi'an)
Shuilu'an Temple
Small Wild Goose Pagoda
Wolong Temple
Xiangji Temple (Shaanxi)
Xingjiao Temple

Shandong 
Four-gates pagoda
Lingyan Temple (Jinan)
Pizhi Pagoda
Xingguo Temple (Jinan)
Zhanshan Temple (Shandong)

Shanghai
Baoshan Temple
Chenxiang Pavilion
Donglin Temple (Shanghai)
Hongfu Temple (Shanghai)
Jade Buddha Temple
Jing'an Temple
Longhua Temple
Yuanming Jiangtang
Zhenru Temple (Shanghai)

Shanxi
Mount Wutai
Bishan Temple
Dailuoding
Foguang Temple
Great White Pagoda
Guangji Temple (Mount Wutai)
Guangzong Temple (Mount Wutai)
Guanhai Temple
Gufo Temple
Jifu Temple
Jile Temple
Jinge Temple
Longhua Temple
Luomuhou Temple
Mimi Temple
Nanchan Temple
Nanshan Temple (Mount Wutai)
Puhua Temple
Pusading
Qixian Temple (Mount Wutai)
Shifang Temple
Shouning Temple
Shuxiang Temple
Tayuan Temple
Wanfo Ge
Wenshu Temple (Mount Wutai)
Xiantong Temple
Yanshan Temple
Youguo Temple
Zhanshan Temple (Mount Wutai)
Zhenrong Temple
Zhulin Temple
Zunsheng Temple
Chongshan Temple (Shanxi)
Guangji Temple (Xinzhou)
Huayan Temple (Datong)
Iron Buddha Temple (Linfen)
Iron Buddha Temple (Gaoping)
Pagoda of Fogong Temple
Puhua Temple
Qifo Temple
Shuanglin Temple
The Hanging Temple
Xuanzhong Temple
Yanqing Temple
Yuanzhao Temple
Zhenguo Temple

Sichuan
Mount Emei
Baoguo Temple (Mount Emei)
Fuhu Temple
Hongchunping Temple
Huazang Temple
Qingyin Pavilion
Wannian Temple
Xixiang Chi 
Xianfeng Temple
Bao'en Temple (Pingwu)
Baoguang Temple
Luohan Temple (Shifang)
Qiongzhu Temple
Wenshu Temple (Chengdu)
Wuyou Temple
Zhaojue Temple

Tianjin 

Guangji Temple (Tianjin)
Temple of Great Compassion

Tibet Autonomous Region (Xizang) 
Chokorgyel Monastery
Dorje Drak
Drepung Monastery
Drongtse Monastery
Dzogchen Monastery
Ganden Monastery
Jokhang Monastery 
Kathok
Khorzhak Monastery
Menri Monastery
Mindrolling Monastery
Nechung
Palpung Monastery
Palyul
Ralung Monastery
Sakya Monastery
Samding Monastery
Samdrup Tarjayling
Samye
Sera Monastery
Shechen Monastery
Simbiling Monastery
Surmang Monastery
Tashi Lhunpo Monastery
Tsi Nesar
Tsurphu Monastery
Yerpa
Yundgrung Ling Monastery

Yunnan
Chongshan Temple (Yunnan)
Foguang Temple (Mangshi)
Guangyun Temple
Huating Temple
Jinlong Temple
Mange Temple
Puti Temple
Qiongzhu Temple
Three Pagodas
Tongwadian (Dali)
Wuyun Temple (Mangshi)
Yuantong Temple
Zhusheng Temple (Yunnan)

Zhejiang
Mount Putuo
Bukenqu Guanyin Temple
Huiji Temple (Mount Putuo)
Fayu Temple
Puji Temple

Baoguo Temple (Zhejiang)
Dafo Temple (Xinchang)
Guoqing Temple
Iron Buddha Temple (Huzhou)
Jingci Temple
Jiangxin Temple
Jingju Temple (Yiwu)
Lingyin Temple
Liuhe Pagoda
Mingjiao Temple (Zhejiang) 
Qita Temple
Temple of King Ashoka
Tiantong Temple
Yanfu Temple (Wuyi County)

Grottoes
Bezeklik Thousand Buddha Caves
Bingling Temple
Dazu Rock Carvings
Hidden Stream Temple Cave
Kizil Caves
Longmen Grottoes
Middle Binyang Cave
Mogao Caves
Mount Emei
Mount Xumi Grottoes
Mutou Valley
North Binyang Cave
South Binyang Cave
Stone Sculptures on Yaowang Mountain
Tuoshan
Yungang Grottoes

Statues
Jade Buddha Palace
Thousand-Armed Thousand-Eyed Guanyin in Longxing Temple
Grand Buddha at Ling Shan
Guanyin Statue of Hainan
Guanyin of Mount Xiqiao
Guan Yin of the South Sea
Leshan Giant Buddha
Ming bronze sculpture of Mount Sumeru in Beijing
Maitreya Buddha at Bingling Temple
Rongxian Buddha
Spring Temple Buddha
Statue of Kun Iam in Macau
Ten Directions Samantabhadra Bodhisattva
Tian Tan Buddha (The Big Buddha) in Hong Kong
White marble Guanyin of Yinxian

External links

China
Buddhist
Buddhist buildings
Buddhist architecture